Camila Manhães Sampaio (born 14 June 1977), known professionally as Camila Pitanga, is a Brazilian actress and former model. She is internationally renowned for her roles in film and television. In film, she is known for her roles in Quilombo, Caramuru: A Invenção do Brasil, Redeemer, I'd Receive the Worst News from Your Beautiful Lips, Rio 2096: A Story of Love and Fury, among others. In television, she is known for her roles in Paraíso Tropical, Cama de Gato, Lado a Lado, Babilônia, and Velho Chico.

Career

Camila Pitanga starred in the film I'd Receive the Worst News from Your Beautiful Lips.

Camila starred in the telenovelas Cama de Gato, Lado a Lado, Babilônia and Velho Chico and was the antagonist in Porto dos Milagres and Paraíso Tropical.

Personal life

Pitanga was born in Rio de Janeiro, Brazil. She is the daughter of actors Vera Manhães and Antônio Pitanga and Benedita da Silva's stepdaughter. She is sister to Rocco Pitanga, also an actor. She is of African descent on her father's and mother's side.

Camila studied at Pentagono College and she is a director of Human Rights Movement.

Camila is an atheist. In 2001, she married the art director Claudio Amaral Peixoto. On 19 May 2008 she gave birth to her first daughter Antonia. The girl's name was a tribute to her father. In 2011, the couple separated.

Filmography

Film

Television

Theatre 
 1994 - A Ira de Aquiles
 1994 - A Ilíada .... Afrodite
 1995 - Orfeu da Conceição
 1995 - Odisséia .... Penélope
 2002 - Arlequim, Servidor de Dois Patrões
 2004 - A Maldição do Vale Negro .... Rosalinda
 2013 - O Duelo

Awards and nominations

References

External links

 

1977 births
Living people
Actresses from Rio de Janeiro (city)
Afro-Brazilian actresses
Brazilian stage actresses
Brazilian film actresses
Brazilian telenovela actresses
Brazilian atheists
Bisexual actresses
Brazilian LGBT actors
21st-century Brazilian actresses
21st-century Brazilian LGBT people
Brazilian bisexual people